Michigan Proposal 20-1 was a ballot initiative approved by voters in Michigan as part of the 2020 United States elections. The ballot initiative amended the Michigan Constitution to require money generated from drilling of oil and gas on state-owned land to be used for upkeep of Michigan's parks and acquisition of land for recreational purposes such as hunting and fishing.

Ballot access
The proposal was unanimously approved by the Michigan House of Representatives and Michigan Senate to be presented to voters.

Contents
The proposal appeared on the ballot as follows:

Support
The proposal was supported by many environmental organizations, as well as DTE Energy and the Democratic Party of Michigan. Becca Maher, the campaign manager for the initiative, wrote "this will create the flexibility needed to fund trails and parks while continuing to prioritize land conservation and protection" and "this ballot measure will not increase taxes."

Opposition
The proposal was opposed by the Green Party of Michigan, writing that "[the proposal] would tie the state's operating budget to continued oil and gas drilling -- including fracking". 

The proposal was also opposed by the Sierra Club's Michigan chapter, writing that while "Sierra Club recognizes and agrees with the need for greater investments in maintenance of recreational facilities within Michigan’s state owned public lands [...] shifting prioritization of money from the MNRTF away from purchasing land and to the maintenance of facilities is shortsighted" and "We can’t continue to rely on oil and gas royalties as a funding source, when we urgently need to end our reliance on them to combat climate change and protect our environment. We need to find new, sustainable, long-term funding sources for the funds. ... Land is non-renewable. If we miss out on the acquisition of a spectacular parcel and it gets sold and subdivided, that’s that—we missed it."

Results

The proposal was approved in a landslide, with around 84% of the vote.

See also
 List of Michigan ballot measures

Notes

References

Michigan Proposal 1
Michigan ballot proposals
Proposal 1